Bruno Engelmeier (5 September 1927 – 2 July 1991) was an Austrian football goalkeeper who played for Austria in the 1958 FIFA World Cup. He was also part of Austria's squad for the football tournament at the 1948 Summer Olympics, but he did not play in any matches. He also played for First Vienna FC and 1. Simmeringer SC.

References

External links
FIFA profile

1927 births
1991 deaths
Footballers from Vienna
Austrian footballers
Austria international footballers
Association football goalkeepers
First Vienna FC players
1958 FIFA World Cup players
Austrian football managers